Bradford Adolphus Street railway station is a closed station in the city of Bradford, West Yorkshire, England.

History
When the Leeds, Bradford and Halifax Junction Railway (later absorbed by the Great Northern) arrived in Bradford they initially built a terminus at Adolphus Street. It was poorly situated, and so a branch line was built from east of the terminus that looped south and joined the existing Lancashire and Yorkshire line at Mill Lane junction. That allowed LB & HJ services to enter Bradford Exchange station.

The station was closed to passengers in 1867 but remained in use for parcels and freight traffic until 1972. The station was later demolished. Only an access ramp and parts of the side wall along Dryden Street remain, as well as parts of the coal depot.

Bradford St James's Market now occupies the greater part of the station site while the new alignment of Wakefield Road runs across the site of the former train shed.

References

External links
Adolphus Street on Disused Stations

Disused railway stations in Bradford
Former Great Northern Railway stations
Railway stations in Great Britain opened in 1854
Railway stations in Great Britain closed in 1867
1854 establishments in England
Disused railway goods stations in Great Britain